Runa may refer to:

People

American 
 Runa Lucienne (born 1988), model and actress

Bengali 
 Runa Islam (born 1970), artist
 Runa Laila (born 1952), singer
 Runa Basu, cricketer

Canadian 
 Runa Reta (born 1980), squash player

Japanese 
 Runa Akiyama (1954-2014), actress
 Runa Imai (born 2000), swimmer
 Runa Takamura (1952–2004), J-pop singer, actress, and dancer

Nepalese 
 Runa Pradhan (born 1984), swimmer

Norwegian 
 Runa Førde (born 1933), painter, illustrator and graphic artist
 Runa Vikestad (born 1984), footballer

Fictional characters 

Runa, an Utgar Minion Kyrie character from the HeroScape miniature wargame
Rūna, a Valkyrie in Marvel Comics
Runa Rindo from Fairy Navigator Runa
 Runa Kuribayashi, a second managers of Jōzenji High School Volleyball in Haikyū!!
Runa Tokisaka, from the anime The SoulTaker
Runa Yomozuki from the manga/anime series Kakegurui
The alternate name of Luna from the Casshan/Casshern series
The alternate name of Luna Platz from Mega Man Star Force

Places 
 Runa, Portugal, a freguesia in Torres Vedras, Portugal
 Runa, West Virginia

Other uses 
Runa (given name), the origins of the name
Runa (band), a Celtic-music band from Newtown, PA
 , a British cargo ship in service 1949–64
 Runa LLC, an American and Ecuadorian beverage company
 A person who speaks Quechua

See also 
 Rune (disambiguation)
 Rune (given name)